Lt. Gen. Roy Kyamko (Ret.) was head of the Armed Forces of the Philippines Southern Command (Southcom) during operations against the Abu Sayyaf Group in 2004.

See also
 Military History of the Philippines
 History of the Philippine Army
 List of conflicts in the Philippines
 List of wars involving the Philippines

References

Commanders of the AFP Western Mindanao Command
Filipino military leaders
Living people
Year of birth missing (living people)
Place of birth missing (living people)